() is an ethnic township located in the Songshan District of Chifeng, Inner Mongolia.

Administrative divisions
Dangpudi is divided into the following village-level divisions:

 Xinjing Village
 Dangpudi Village
 Daxinglongzhuang Village
 Xiaoxinglongzhuang Village
 Xinglongwa Village
 Beidao Village
 Guanjiaying Village
 Majiazi Village
 Wangjiayingzi Village
 Xindian Village
 Halahaigou Village
 Nianzigou Village
 Hajingou Village
 Shijiezhuang Village
 Liujiagou Village
 Damutougou Village
 Nanpingfang Village
 Hashitu Village
 Shijianggou Village
 Xiaomutougou Village
 Jiaojiayingzi Village
 Sanjia Village
 Sidaogouliang Village
 Longwangmiao Village
 Zhalanfen Village

Demographics 
As of 2018, the ethnic township has a hukou population of 41,822. As of 2012, the ethnic township was home to approximately 42,000 people, comprising 9,854 households. Of the ethnic township's population, 6,019 people, or approximately 14% of the population, were ethnically Manchu as of 2012.

Economy 
As of 2015, the ethnic township had a gross domestic product (GDP) of 1.46 billion yuan, and 70.466 million yuan of fiscal revenue. The ethnic township's rural population has an annual disposable income averaging 11,057 yuan.

Dangpudi's local economy is dominated by the agricultural sector, which employs about 12,000 workers. Major agricultural products of the ethnic township include fruits, vegetables, pork, beef, and donkey meat.

The ethnic township also attracts rural tourism, and mining of minerals such as molybdenum is also present in Dangpudi.

Poverty alleviation 
During the mid-2010's, the government of Inner Mongolia launched a program to improve living conditions within the county. This program involved renovating homes which were deemed "dangerous", paving many previously unpaved roads, expanding safe drinking water infrastructure, improving health infrastructure, expanding the ethnic township's cultural facilities, and improving the ethnic township's supermarkets among other activities.

See also 
 Manchu people
 Songshan District

References 

Township-level divisions of Inner Mongolia
Ethnic townships of the People's Republic of China
Chifeng